Kanuman may refer to:

 Kanuma, Tochigi, a city in Tochigi Prefecture, Japan
 Kanuma Station, a railway station
 Eri Kanuma, Japanese actress Toshie Furuoya (born 1952)
 Naoki Kanuma (born 1997), Japanese footballer
 Kanuma, brand name of Sebelipase alfa, a drug